Mordellistena erythreana is a beetle in the genus Mordellistena of the family Mordellidae. It was described in 1933 by Maurice Pic.

References

erythreana
Beetles described in 1933